Aracana aurita, striped cowfish, Shaw's cowfish, striped boxfish, painted boxfish, southern cowfish or Shaw's boxfish is a species of boxfish native to the Eastern Indian Ocean. The species was first described by George Shaw in 1798. It is carnivorous and exposes prey in the benthic zone by blowing a jet of water onto sediment.

Morphology
The striped cowfish is larger than its close cousin the ornate cowfish, with a maximum length of 20 cm. The species is sexually dimorphic. Females and juveniles are pale orange to brown, with irregular brown and white lines, while males bright orange with blue lines and spots.

The fish's body is encased in a rigid box-like carapace made of large bony plates. It has three curved spines on top, one on the mid side and three along the bottom.

Habitat
The striped cowfish lives in temperate waters of the eastern Indian Ocean, around southern Australia, and by some other islands of Oceania. It primarily lives among sea grass beds and rocky reef at a depth of 10–200 meters.

References 

striped cowfish
striped cowfish